Mashnaq (also Romanized as Meshnaq; also known as Eslāmābād-e Mashnaq, Meshnak, and Moshnegh) is a village in Guney-ye Markazi Rural District, in the Central District of Shabestar County, East Azerbaijan Province, Iran. At the 2006 census, its population was 533, in 195 families.

References 

Populated places in Shabestar County